Lu Harris-Champer (born June 16, 1967) is a former American softball coach who most recently served as the head coach at Georgia.

Early life and education
Lu Harris-Champer was born in San Diego, California on June 16, 1967. She would later go on to graduate from Western Illinois University.

Coaching career

Nicholls State
At Nicholls State, Harris-Champer had an overall record of 90–40–1 (.691) in her two years as head coach from 1996 to 1997.

Southern Miss
At Southern Miss, Harris-Champer had an overall record of 115–22 (.839) in her two years as head coach from 1999 to 2000.

Georgia
Harris-Champer has been the head softball coach of the Georgia Bulldogs softball team since 2001. On June 6, 2021, Harris-Champer announced her retirement. During her career at Georgia, she led the team to 959 victories, two Southeastern Conference championships (2003, 2005), one SEC Tournament title (2014), 19-straight NCAA Tournament appearances, 11 Super Regionals, and five trips to the Women's College World Series, including final four appearances in 2009 and 2010.

Personal life
Lu is married to her husband Jerry, they have twin daughters, Jenna and Emma, and another daughter named Mya.

Head coaching record

College

References

Living people
Female sports coaches
American softball coaches
Georgia Bulldogs softball coaches
Western Illinois Leathernecks softball players
Western Illinois Leathernecks softball coaches
Nicholls Colonels softball coaches
Southern Miss Golden Eagles softball coaches
1967 births